Manolo Villaverde (born August 6, 1934) is an actor who played a lead role in the television show Que Pasa, U.S.A.? His character was named Pepe. The cast, Villaverde included, worked hard to not "over-act." Manolo Villaverde and the other cast members were chosen for the show specifically because of their vast experience in theater in both Cuba and America.

Awards 
Manolo Villaverde became an Emmy Award winner due to his performance in Que Pasa, U.S.A.? at the 1978 Second Annual regional Emmy Awards. Manolo Villaverde was one of the cast member winners, as well as Ana Margarita Martinez-Casado, and Luis Oquendo.

Other television experience 
Villaverde played the character Rafael in Amores y Amorios on August 7, 1966.

Villaverde also played Abuelo on the Nickelodeon children's show Gullah Gullah Island.

Personal life 
According to an "Actor Update" section from 2008 written on the Facebook page dedicated to Que Pasa, U.S.A? Villaverde is currently a resident in South Florida. He spent time working on a historical novel about classical music composers. As hobbies, Villaverde enjoys painting, keeping a vast book and film collection, and traveling.

References

1934 births
American male television actors
Male actors from Florida
20th-century American male actors
Living people
Place of birth missing (living people)